Glen Falls is a small waterfall located on Ellicott Creek in the village of Williamsville, New York.  The hydropower provided by the falls made it an ideal site for a number of early watermills used to grind grist and to power sawmills.

One of the earliest settlers of what is now Williamsville, Jonas Williams, owned two mills on opposite sides of Ellicott Creek. The name of these mills, Williams Mills, eventually transformed into the name of the village in which the falls is located, Williamsville. The vertical drop is part of the Onondaga Escarpment, a portion of which runs through Williamsville. Today, the falls forms part of the eastern border of Glen Park.

References

External links 
 A 1909 photograph of Glen Falls

Waterfalls of New York (state)
Landforms of Erie County, New York